The Cal 2-27 is an American sailboat, that was designed by William Lapworth and first built in 1974.

The Cal 2-27 design replaced the earlier Cal 27 and was replaced in turn in the Cal Yachts line, by the Cal 3-27 in 1983.

Production
The Cal 2-27 was built by Cal Yachts (Jensen Marine) in the United States between 1974 and 1980, but it is now out of production. During its six-year production run 656 examples were built.

The boat was also developed into the Crown 28 in Canada by Calgan Marine.

Design

The Cal 2-27 is a small recreational keelboat, built predominantly of fiberglass, with wood trim. It has a masthead sloop rig, an internally-mounted spade-type rudder and a fixed fin keel. It displaces  and carries  of ballast.

The boat was initially factory-fitted with a Universal Atomic 4 gasoline engine, although later in the production run a Farymann diesel engine became an option.

See also
List of sailing boat types

Related development
Cal 27
Cal 3-27
Crown 28

Similar sailboats
Aloha 27
C&C 27
Catalina 27
Catalina 270
Catalina 275 Sport
CS 27
Edel 820
Express 27
Fantasia 27
Halman Horizon
Hotfoot 27
Hullmaster 27
Hunter 27
Hunter 27-2
Hunter 27-3
Island Packet 27
Mirage 27 (Perry)
Mirage 27 (Schmidt)
O'Day 272
Orion 27-2
Tanzer 27
Watkins 27
Watkins 27P

References

External links

Keelboats
1970s sailboat type designs
Sailing yachts
Sailboat type designs by Bill Lapworth
Sailboat types built by Cal Yachts